Tone Pahle (born 1 October 1954 in Oslo, Norway) is a Norwegian sport rower. She was born in Oslo. She competed at the 1976 Summer Olympics in Montreal.

She was for a time the Chair of the Masters Commission of FISA, the International Rowing Federation, and thereby a member of the FISA Council.

References

External links

1954 births
Living people
Rowers from Oslo
Norwegian female rowers
Olympic rowers of Norway
Rowers at the 1976 Summer Olympics